Kapasgola Jamtola Shahi Jame Mosque is a mosque located in the Chowk Bazar  area of  Chittagong.

See also
 List of mosques in Bangladesh

References

Mosques in Chittagong